The 2005–06 San Miguel Beermen season was the 31st season of the franchise in the Philippine Basketball Association (PBA).

Key dates
August 14: The 2005 PBA Draft took place in Sta. Lucia East Grand Mall, Cainta, Rizal.

Draft picks

Roster

Fiesta Conference

Game log

|- bgcolor="#edbebf"
| 1
| October 7
| Talk 'N Text
| 66–74
| Hill (21)
| 
| 
| Ynares Center
| 0–1
|- bgcolor="#edbebf"
| 2
| October 12
| Coca Cola
| 77–79
| Seigle (27)
| 
| 
| Ynares Center
| 0–2
|- bgcolor="#edbebf" 
| 3
| October 16
| Purefoods
| 90–92 OT
| Seigle (30)
| 
| 
| Araneta Coliseum
| 0–3
|- bgcolor="#edbebf" 
| 4
| October 23
| Red Bull
| 74–76
| Hill (19)
| 
| 
| Araneta Coliseum
| 0–4
|- bgcolor="#bbffbb" 
| 5
| October 29
| Air21
| 123–119 (2OT) 
| Hill (22)
| 
| 
| Roxas City
| 1–4

|- bgcolor="#edbebf" 
| 6
| November 2
| Brgy.Ginebra
| 72–74
| Hill (20)
| 
| 
| Cuneta Astrodome
| 1–5
|- bgcolor="#edbebf" 
| 7
| November 9
| Sta.Lucia
| 82–85
| Ildefonso (18)
| 
| 
| Araneta Coliseum
| 1–6
|- bgcolor="#edbebf" 
| 8
| November 11
| Air21
| 86–90
| Johnson (19)
| 
| 
| Araneta Coliseum
| 1–7
|- bgcolor="#edbebf" 
| 9
| November 18
| Sta.Lucia
| 80–85
| 
| 
| 
| Ynares Center
| 1–8

|- bgcolor="#bbffbb" 
| 10
| December 2
| Alaska
| 66–62
| 
| 
| 
| Araneta Coliseum
| 2–8
|- bgcolor="#bbffbb"
| 11
| December 6
| Red Bull
| 83–77 
| 
| 
| 
| Iloilo City
| 3–8
|- bgcolor="#bbffbb" 
| 12
| December 9
| Coca Cola
| 90–76
| Belasco (17)
| 
| 
| Cuneta Astrodome
| 4–8
|- bgcolor="#bbffbb" 
| 13
| December 11
| Purefoods
| 74–68
| Seigle (23)
| 
| 
| Ynares Center
| 5–8
|- bgcolor="#bbffbb" 
| 14
| December 16
| Brgy.Ginebra
| 86–78
| 
| 
| 
| Cuneta Astrodome
| 6–8
|- bgcolor="#edbebf"
| 15
| December 21
| Alaska
| 
| 
| 
| 
| Cuneta Astrodome
| 6–9
|- bgcolor="#edbebf"
| 16
| December 23
| Talk 'N Text
| 73–94
| 
| 
| 
| Cuneta Astrodome
| 6–10

Transactions

Trades

Additions

Subtractions

References

San Miguel Beermen seasons
San